Ivan Kuleshov (born 29 November 1946) is a Russian former wrestler who competed in the 1972 Summer Olympics.

References

External links
 

1946 births
Living people
Olympic wrestlers of the Soviet Union
Wrestlers at the 1972 Summer Olympics
Russian male sport wrestlers
Place of birth missing (living people)